Transformers: Robots in Disguise is an American animated robot superhero television series for children produced by Hasbro Studios and Darby Pop Productions in the United States for Cartoon Network. It was also animated by Polygon Pictures in Japan. It is the stand-alone sequel 
to Transformers: Prime that ran from 2010 to 2013 on The Hub Network, featuring characters (most of whose voice actors reprise their roles) and storylines mostly self-contained from the events of its predecessor as well as an overall more lighthearted tone. Roberto Orci and Alex Kurtzman (the executive producers of Prime) did not return to the new series. In the United States, the series ran on Cartoon Network from March 14, 2015, to November 11, 2017.

The show's second season, featuring guest appearances from some returning Transformers: Prime characters, premiered on February 20, 2016. A six-episode mini-series centered on the return of Starscream premiered in Canada on September 10, 2016, before debuting on U.S television the following month. The third and final season, subtitled Combiner Force, aired from April 29, 2017, to November 11, 2017.

It was the first Transformers series to feature Bumblebee as the main protagonist rather than Optimus Prime, the leader of the Autobots and the main protagonist in most of the other series (though Optimus appears in a semi-regular role throughout Robots in Disguise).

Plot

Season 1
Three years after life was restored to the planet Cybertron, a new generation of Transformers enjoys a new age of prosperity. Earth no longer remembers the Decepticon-Autobot conflict as the Cybertronians stopped visiting the planet. Bumblebee has since become a seasoned Cybertronian police officer and despite his fame, he chooses to be a humble peacekeeper. Things change when he is summoned by the vision of Optimus Prime. Thought to be long dead after restoring Cybertron's population, Optimus Prime calls for Bumblebee to return to Earth as a new threat appears.

With the help of Sideswipe (a rebel "bad boy bot") and Strongarm (an Elite Guard cadet partnered to him), the trio makes it to Earth to discover a crashed maximum security prison ship called the Alchemor and its steward Fixit (a hyperactive Mini-Con with faulty wiring). They soon learn the Alchemor had some "a couple hundred" Decepticon prisoners within Stasis Pods, but all of its inmates have escaped. It is now their duty to recapture all the escaped Decepticon prisoners before they cause further harm on Earth. With the aid of humans Russell and Denny Clay and the Dinobot Grimlock (who was a prisoner of Alchemor for committing property damage before siding with Bumblebee), Bumblebee leads this unlikely team to protect Earth from the Decepticon prisoners and restore order. During their mission they often clash with Steeljaw who soon forms his own group of fellow Decepticon prisoners (consisting of the metal-eating Underbite, crime boss Thunderhoof, stranded bounty hunter Fracture and his Mini-Con partners Airazor and Divebomb, and cowardly informant Clampdown) to contend with the Autobots and attempt to conquer Earth.

The Autobots are later joined with the likes of Autobot bounty hunter Drift, his Mini-Con partners Slipstream and Jetstorm, the female warrior Windblade, and Optimus Prime, who returns from the dead in the wake of the arrival of Megatronus, who was the one that crashed the Alchemor to free the prisoners (and subsequently blackmailed Steeljaw into helping him escape his imprisonment) and who the Thirteen Primes have been preparing Optimus for. During the battle against Megatronus, Bumblebee, Sideswipe, and Strongarm realize they can combine their Decepticon hunters together and become more powerful. With this new knowledge, the Autobots prevail, seemingly destroying Megatronus with a powerful energy beam, and apprehending Underbite, Thunderhoof, Fracture, and Clampdown, though Steeljaw escapes. Bumblebee then finally overcomes his insecurities of being a worthy leader, finding his perfect rallying cry ("Rev up and Roll out!"), and chooses to remain on Earth to protect it from any other potential future threats, as do the rest of his team, including Optimus, who states that from now on he will be Bumblebee's equal rather than leader, to which Bumblebee agrees.

Season 2
Weeks after Megatronus' defeat, the Autobots continue to deal with the threat of the Decepticon fugitives that are still on Earth. While Steeljaw is still at large, he eventually discovers another group of Decepticons stationed on the crashed remains of a second half of the Alchemor that is dubbed "Decepticon Island" and led by Glowstrike, Scorponok, and Saberhorn. As Optimus is weakened when the immense power he was lent from the Primes is drained by them, the Autobots split into two teams: an Away Team led by Optimus and consisting of Drift, Slipstream, Jetstorm, Sideswipe, and Windblade, and another team led by Bumblebee that remains at their scrapyard base. Along the way, the Autobots run into a strange occurrence in the form of Decepticon criminals who are not listed in the Alchemor prisoner manifest yet have criminal records on Cybertron. At the same time, Steeljaw attempts to prove himself to the Decepticon Island by not only freeing Thunderhoof and Clampdown, but also new prisoners, including criminal Bisk, wrestler Groundpounder, saboteur Overload, anarchist Quillfire, and mythical city hunter Springload, to be his "elite warriors."

During this time, Optimus slowly recovers his strength and teaches his team valuable lessons about teamwork. Fixit eventually repairs the Autobots' Ground Bridge, which was destroyed by an explosion that occurred after he originally dispatched the Away Team; however, a malfunction allows the Decepticon Soundwave (who was trapped in the Shadowzone - a parallel dimension where anyone and anything becomes completely invisible and can't interact with normal space, as if they were out of phase - in the season 3 finale of Transformers: Prime) to escape. Soundwave then attempts to contact the former Decepticon leader Megatron (who went into a self-induced exile following the events of Predacons Rising) and have him return to Earth, but is thwarted by Team Bee and returned to the Shadowzone.

As the two Autobot teams are reunited, they pair up with the Autobot medical officer and Optimus and Bumblebee's old friend and teammate Ratchet, along with his Mini-Con Undertone, to apprehend the rest of the Decepticons on Decepticon Island. Using a Stasis Bomb, they manage to place Decepticons in stasis, while Bumblebee and Optimus, aided by Fixit and his fellow Caretaker Mini-Cons who were enslaved, defeat Steeljaw. Following their victory, Optimus Prime, Ratchet, Windblade, and the Caretaker Mini-Cons repair the ship and return all Decepticon prisoners to Cybertron, as Bumblebee and his team reside on Earth.

Miniseries
Shortly after the Autobots' victory on Decepticon Island, a group of Decepticon Scavengers arrive on Earth looking for relics from the Great War; they have been partnered with Weaponizer Mini-Cons, a breed of Mini-Cons who can control the bodies of their wielder and grant team great powers. At the same time, Starscream (who was presumed dead after the events of Predacons Rising) revealed that he killed the Predacons (minus Predaking) using weapons horded by Megatron, makes an unexpected return, and is aided by a trio of bounty hunters - Shadelock, RoughEdge, and Razorhorn - in his quest for the powerful Dark Star Saber and the Weaponizer Mini-Cons, intending to use them to rebuild the Decepticon Empire and exact revenge on Megatron for all of the abuse he inflicted upon him. Upon learning the truth from the Mini-Con Sawtooth, the Weaponizers abandon the Scavengers and later ally themselves with the Autobots, aiding them in their battle against Starscream. Ultimately, all the Decepticons, including Starscream, are defeated and placed onto Optimus' ship alongside the Dark Star Saber, who leaves to deliver them to the Cybertronian Authorities. The Weaponizers thank the Autobots for saving them and then they leave in their Sub-Orbital Craft (which Fixit both fixed and modified for space travel) with the intent of "going where they will never be found".

Season 3: Combiner Force
Sometime after their victory against Starscream and the Scavengers, Team Bee crosses paths with the Stunticons, a group of Decepticons consisting of Motormaster, Dragstrip, Slashmark, Heatseeker, and Wildbreak, who can combine to form the massive Menasor. In order to combat this new threat, the Autobots need to learn how to combine themselves, becoming Ultra Bee.

Following the Stunticons' defeat, Optimus Prime has them and several other Decepticons that have been captured recently stored away in his ship so he could return them to Cybertron. He also enlists Drift and his Mini-Con students to accompany him for a special mission. Meanwhile, Soundwave attempts to escape from the Shadowzone once again, aided by a group of Activator Mini-Cons, and Steeljaw, Underbite, Thunderhoof, Quillfire, and Clampdown also return to cause more problems for the Autobots, attempting to capture Team Bee for their mysterious benefactors on Cybertron who arranged for them to be pardoned of their respective crimes. Soundwave eventually escapes from the Shadowzone and is revealed to also be allied with Steeljaw's mysterious benefactors, but is defeated by Team Bee before he could activate a beacon to summon Megatron, and subsequently taken back to Cybertron by Optimus Prime to stand trial. Soundwave and Steeljaw's mysterious benefactors are later revealed to be the Autobot High Council, who are actually Decepticon infiltrators and manipulators Cyclonus, Cyberwarp, Riotgear, Skyjack, and Treadshock who have plans to invade Earth. After a battle for the fate of both Earth and Cybertron, the High Council, in their combined form of Galvatronus, are ultimately defeated by Ultra Bee, and the Autobots restore order to Cybertron.

As a new Autobot High Council is formed, Team Bee returns to live on Earth as ambassadors and continue protecting it from any possible future threats while working to find Steeljaw who is still at large.

Characters

Episodes

Cast

Main cast
 Stuart Allan - Russell Clay, Toddler Son (ep. 35)
 Eric Bauza - Drift, Headlock, Pseudo, Silverhound, Back, Forth, Lt. Ziegler (ep. 17), Look-Out (ep. 23), Male Tourist (ep. 24), Police Officer (ep. 26), Scoutmaster #2 (ep. 28), Major Mayhem (ep. 37), Scientist (ep. 48), Radio Commercial Announcer (ep. 51), Instructor (ep. 55), Computer Voice (ep. 56)
 Darren Criss - Sideswipe, Son (ep. 28)
 Will Friedle - Bumblebee, Ultra Bee, Butch, Righty, Dispatcher (ep. 1), Motorist (ep. 5), Junior (ep. 7), Security Guard (ep. 10), Game Voice (ep. 12), Father (ep. 28), Security Guard (ep. 34)
 Ted McGinley - Denny Clay, Sea Captain (ep. 3)
 Khary Payton - Grimlock, Bisk, Divebomb, Newsman (ep. 1, 54), Dad (ep. 7), Operator (ep. 10), Bot (ep. 15), Anchorman (ep. 30), Stadium Announcer (ep. 34), Impound Lot Guard (ep. 35), Dispatcher (ep. 46), Proctor #1 (ep. 56)
 Mitchell Whitfield - Fixit, Toolbox, Cinch, Groundskeeper (ep. 4), Museum Staff Member (ep. 5), TV Announcer (ep. 11), Major Mayhem (ep. 37)
 Constance Zimmer - Strongarm, Filch, Wingcode, Matronly Docent (ep. 1, 46), Ship's Computer (ep. 18)

Additional voices
 Jonathan Adams - Razorpaw
 Carlos Alazraqui - Hammer, Anvil, Nigel (ep. 34)
 Dee Bradley Baker - Bludgeon, Clout
 Troy Baker - Steeljaw, Vector Prime, Arnold (ep. 6), Blue Car Driver (ep. 14)
 Jeff Bennett - Axiom, Theorem
 Gregg Berger - Stockade, Major Mayhem (ep. 37)
 Ted Biaselli - Octopunch
 Steve Blum - Starscream, Backtrack, Ransack, Polarclaw, Aerobolt
 Kate Bond - Casey (ep. 19, 55)
 Victor Brandt - Scorponok
 Jeffrey Combs - Ratchet
 Ian James Corlett - Shadow Raker
 Peter Cullen - Optimus Prime
 Jim Cummings - Clampdown, Thermidor, Vehicon Sentry #1 (ep. 38)
 Eddie Deezen - Ped
 Trevor Devall - Hermit (ep. 46, 47), Patrolman #2 (ep. 46)
 John DiMaggio - Groundpounder, Farnum (ep. 19)
 Robin Atkin Downes - Jacknab, Pilfer, Flamesnort
 Chris Edgerly - Crustacion, Video Game Voice (ep. 48)
 Dave Fennoy - Overload
 Crispin Freeman - Sawtooth
 Bailey Gambertoglio - Hank
 Gil Gerard - Megatronus/The Fallen
 Brooke Goldner - Cyberwarp
 Grey Griffin - Glowstrike
 Jackée Harry - Zizza
 Mark Hildreth - Scowl, Automated Announcer (ep. 22)
 David Hunt - Chop Shop
 Danny Jacobs - Brother Gunter (ep. 42)
 John Katovsich - Larry LaRue (ep. 7)
 David Kaye - Hammerstrike, Slashmark, Announcer (ep. 55)
 Mikey Kelley - Heatseeker, Heatmark, Opposing Captain (ep. 46)
 Tom Kenny - Nightstrike, Police Officer (ep. 15)
 Arif S. Kinchen - Jazz
Matthew Yang King - Simacore, Computer Voice (ep. 32)
 Maurice LaMarche - Dragstrip, Dragbreak
 Harry Lennix - Cyclonus
 Erica Lindbeck - Windblade (season 3)
 Yuri Lowenthal - Glacius
 Edie McClurg - Realtor (ep. 41)
 Andy Milder - Quillfire, Father (ep. 35)
 Max Mittelman - Blurr
 Liam O'Brien - Underbite, Kickback, Cybertron Museum Guard #1 (ep. 1)
 Adrian Pasdar - Micronus Prime
 Rick Pasqualone - Buzzstrike
 Lori Petty - Nightra
 Kevin Pollak - Fracture, Tour Boat Captain (ep. 14)
 Kevin Michael Richardson - Bulkhead, Terrashock, Gallery Narrator (ep. 5)
 Robbie Rist - Tricerashot, Swelter 
 John Steven Rocha - Springload
 Daniel Roebuck - Malodor, Computer Voice (ep. 13)
 Charlie Schlatter - Vertebreak
 David Sheinkopf - Dropforge
 Roger Craig Smith - Slipstream, Jetstorm, Airazor, Blastwave, Scoutmaster #1 (ep. 28), Major Mayhem (ep. 37)
 Andre Sogliuzzo - Clawtrap
 Kath Soucie - Tour Guide (ep. 24)
 Jason Spisak - Paralon
 Frank Stallone - Thunderhoof
 Raymond Stein - Police Officer (ep. 7)
 Christopher Swindle - Ragebyte
 Fred Tatasciore - Saberhorn, Night Watchman (ep. 29), Vehicon Guard #1 (ep. 38)
 James Arnold Taylor - Crazybolt, Boostwing, Arnold (ep. 30), Teenage Boy (ep. 53)
 Kirk Thornton - Shadelock
 Robin Weigert - Scatterspike
 Frank Welker - Soundwave, Mayor's Secretary (ep. 66)
 Gary Anthony Williams - Slicedice, Dad (ep. 30)
 Travis Willingham - Motormaster, Menasor
 Dave Wittenberg - Wildbreak
 Kristy Wu - Windblade (seasons 1–2), Newswoman (ep. 5), Woman's Voice (ep. 10), Pilot (ep. 23), Mother (ep. 28)
 Michael Yurchak - Zorillor

Broadcast

United States
The series was originally planned to premiere on what was known as the Hub Network (a joint venture between Hasbro and Discovery Communications). However, on October 7, 2014, just days before the channel's re-branding as Discovery Family that took place on October 13, it was announced that the series would premiere on Cartoon Network instead. Hasbro Studios president Stephen Davis felt that Cartoon Network was a more appropriate home for a Transformers series due to its male-oriented demographics, having felt that Hub Network had been skewed towards girls. Previous animated Transformers series had also aired on Cartoon Network prior to the launch of the joint venture and Hasbro Studios.

The series debuted with a special prime time premiere of the two-part pilot on March 14, 2015, followed by the regular time slot debut, starting with an encore of "Pilot" Pt. 1, on March 21.

Season 2 ran from February 20 to May 14, 2016. The six-part miniseries premiered on October 22 and concluded on December 3.

Season 3 ran from April 29 to November 11, 2017. It was the third and final season.

International

On January 13, 2015, it was announced that Cartoon Network has acquired the rights to broadcast the series worldwide, similarly to the global distribution of Prime before it.

Several countries have premiered the series before the United States. On February 9, Canal J premiered the series in France, making it the first in the world to broadcast it on television. On March 2, Biggs premiered it in Portugal. In Italy, K2 aired the pilot on March 7, followed by the official premiere on March 9. On March 13, Cartoon Network Arabic premiered the Arabic version of the series .

Among English-speaking countries, Cartoon Network in Australia was first to debut the series, having premiered it on February 21. On March 7, the series debuted on two versions of Cartoon Network, one available in the United Kingdom, Ireland and Malta, the other broadcasting in English to Greece, Greek Cyprus, the Middle East and Africa. In Canada, the show premiered on Teletoon on March 21. The series was premiered on May 23, 2015, on Cartoon Network India. The series also aired on Toonami in India in English and on Voot, a viacom18 app in Hindi-dubbed version. It also aired on Cartoon Network Hd+ in India until July 2019. In Croatia, the series debuted on April 23, 2018, in RTL Kockica channel.

Season 1 made its debut on CITV weekday morning lineup on January 4, 2016. Season 2 first aired on CITV in March 2016 in the UK.

First season had a break after episode 13 on June 14, and resumed on September 20 with episode 14. The songs "Save the Future!!" and "Try (Transformers: Adventure)"  replace the original opening and closing themes, respectively. Takara Tomy, the company that has been representing Transformers franchise in Japan since its inception under the pre-merger Takara, is marketing and promoting associated toys on behalf of Hasbro.

Home media
Shout Factory  released the first five episodes onto DVD titled A New Autobot Mission on October 27, 2015. They released the complete first season on May 10, 2016.

In Australia, Beyond Home Entertainment released the complete first season onto DVD on September 1, 2015; they also released a single-disc DVD comprising the first seven episodes on the same day.

References

External links

 
  at Cartoon Network
  at Hasbro Studios
 Transformers: Robots in Disguise at Transformers Wiki

Cartoon Network original programming
2010s American animated television series
2015 American television series debuts
2017 American television series endings
2010s American science fiction television series
Television shows set in the United States
English-language television shows
Anime-influenced Western animated television series
Polygon Pictures
American sequel television series
Robots in Disguise (2015 TV series)
Television series by Hasbro Studios
American children's animated action television series
American children's animated adventure television series
American children's animated science fantasy television series
American children's animated superhero television series
Robot superheroes